Peroxiredoxin-4 is a protein that in humans is encoded by the PRDX4 gene. It is a member of the peroxiredoxin family of antioxidant enzymes.

Function 

The protein encoded by this gene is an antioxidant enzyme of the peroxiredoxin family. The protein is localized to the cytoplasm. Peroxidases of the peroxiredoxin family reduce hydrogen peroxide and alkyl hydroperoxides to water and alcohol with the use of reducing equivalents derived from thiol-containing donor molecules. This protein has been found to play a regulatory role in the activation of the transcription factor NF-kappaB.

Interactions 

PRDX4 has been shown to interact with Peroxiredoxin 1.

References

Further reading